Barbour's seahorse (Hippocampus barbouri) is a species of fish of the family Syngnathidae.

Habitat 
Hippocampus barbouri is found in seagrasses and shallow waters off the coasts of the Philippines, Malaysia, and Indonesia. The Barbour's Seahorse is native to Indonesia (Bali, Jawa, Kalimantan, Sulawesi), Malaysia (Sabah), and the Philippines. Habitats include seagrass beds, mangrove swamps, estuaries, and muddy areas.

Population 

Records show a 30% decline in the H. barbouri population over the past 10 years, which has continued to increase due to over fishing and the destruction of seagrass habitats. Exact numbers are unknown but percentage estimates can be made using fishing records. H. barbouri is classified as Vulnerable by the 2017 IUCN red list assessments. They were first put on the Red list in 1996. Respondents at various levels of trade (including fishers, buyers, wholesalers, retailers, exporters and officials) in 1998 and 1999 in Malaysia reported declines in seahorse numbers and availability and that H. barbouri was one of the most common species traded.

Feeding and identification 
The Barbour's seahorse feeds on small shrimp, crustaceans, calanoid copepods and decapod larvae, but has also been known to ingest the larvae of polychaetes and fish.

Individuals have well developed spines such as their sharp eye, nose, and double cheek spine. The longest and broadest of the spines is its first dorsal spine. Its tail is relatively short in proportion to its body and has a series of long and short spines along it. They range in color from white to yellow to greenish gray to light brown, and some may have some reddish-brown spots or lines. It is often confused with the hedgehog seahorse, Hippocampus histrix.

Reproduction 
This species is ovoviviparous, with males carrying eggs before giving birth to live young. The female deposits her eggs into the male's brood pouch. Through the pregnancy the pair strengthens their pair bonds with daily greetings. The gestation period for H. barbouri is 12–14 days, with a typical brood size of about 10–240 offspring. They give no parental care to juveniles after birth. Pairs mate monogamously, and may mate many times in a single season.

Predation 
Hippocampus barbouri are most vulnerable during the juvenile stage. They use crypsis as a mechanism for survival. The spiny texture of its skin and coloration allow it to camouflage itself among the corals they associate with.

Aquaculture 
These seahorses are widely traded for traditional medicines and aquarium trading. This, along with the fact that their habitat it being destroyed, has caused their population size to continuously decrease.

Naming 
The specific name honours the American zoologist and herpetologist Thomas Barbour 1884–1946.

References

Further reading 
 Pollom, R. 2017. Hippocampus barbouri. The IUCN Red List of Threatened Species 2017:e.T40802A54906903. http://oldredlist.iucnredlist.org/details/40802/0
 Payne, M. F. (2003). Rearing the coral seahorse, Hippocampus barbouri, on live and inert prey. Marine Ornamental Species: Collection, Culture & Conservation, 289–296.
 Lourie, S. A., Green, D. M., & Vincent, A. C. J. (2005). Dispersal, habitat differences, and comparative phylogeography of Southeast Asian seahorses (Syngnathidae: Hippocampus). Molecular ecology, 14(4), 1073–1094.
 Perez-Oconer, E. (2002). Reproductive biology and gestation of the male seahorse, Hippocampus barbouri (Jordan and Richardson 1908) (Doctoral dissertation, PhD thesis, University of the Philippines, Quezon City, Philippines).
 Foster, S J. 2016. Seahorses (Hippocampus spp.) and the CITES Review of Significant Trade. Fisheries Centre Research Reports 48(8): 48 pp.
 Foster, S.J. and Vincent, A.C.J. 2004. Life history and ecology of seahorses: implications for conservation and management. Journal of Fish Biology 65: 1–61.
 Giles, B.G., Truong, S.K., Do, H.H. and Vincent, A.C.J. 2006. The catch and trade of seahorses in Vietnam. Biodiversity Conservation, pp. 2497–2513.
 Hou, F., Wen, L., Peng, C. and Guo, J. 2016. Identification of marine traditional Chinese medicine dried seahorses in the traditional Chinese medicine market using DNA barcoding. Mitochondrial DNA Early View: 1–6.
 IUCN. 2017. The IUCN Red List of Threatened Species. Version 2017-3. Available at: www.iucnredlist.org. (Accessed: 7 December 2017).
 Lawson, J M., Foster, S.J. and Vincent, A.C.J. 2017. Low bycatch rates add up to big numbers for a genus of small fishes. Fisheries 42(1): 19–33.
 Lim, A.C.O., Chong, V.C., Wong, C.S. and Choo, C.K. 2011. Diversity, habitats and conservation threats of syngnathid (Syngnathidae) fishes in Malaysia. Tropical Zoology 24: 193–222.
 Lourie, S.A. 2016. Seahorses: A Life-Size Guide to Every Species. The University of Chicago Press, Chicago, Illinois, USA, 160 pp.
 Lourie, S.A., Pollom, R.A. and Foster, S.J. 2016. A global revision of the seahorses Hippocampus Rafinesque 1810 (Actinopterygii: Syngnathiformes): Taxonomy and biogeography with recommendations for future research. Zootaxa 4146(1): 1–66.
 Lourie, S.A., Vincent, A.C.J. and Hall, H.J. 1999. Seahorses: an identification guide to the world's species and their conservation. Project Seahorse, London, U.K.
 Marcus, J.E., Samoilys, M.A., Meeuwig, J.J., Villongco, Z.A.D. and Vincent, A.C.J. 2007. Benthic status of near-shore fishing grounds in the central Philippines and associated seahorse densities. Marine Pollution Bulletin 54(9): 1483–1494.
 Morgan, S.K. 2007. The ontogoenetic ecology and conservation of exploited tropical seahorses. Department of Biology, McGill University.
 O'Donnell, K.P., Pajaro, M.G. and Vincent, A.C.J. 2010. How does the accuracy of fisher knowledge affect seahorse conservation status? Animal Conservation 13(6): 526–533.
 Perante, N.C., Pajaro, M.G., Meeuwig, J.J. and Vincent, A.C.J. 2002. Biology of a seahorse species Hippocampus comes in the central Philippines. Journal of Fish Biology 60: 821–837.
 Short, F.T., Polidoro, B., Livingston, S.R., Carpenter, K.E., Bandeira, S., Bujang, J.S., Calumpong, H.P., Carruthers, T.J.B., Coles, R.G., Dennison, W.C., Erftemeijer, P.L.A., Fortes, M.D., Freeman, A.S., Jagtap, T.G., Kamal, A.H.M., Kendrick, G.A., Kenworthy, W.J., Nafie, Y.A.L., Nasution, I.M., Orth, R.J., Prathep, A., Sanciango, J.C., van Tussenbroek, Vergara, S.G., Waycott, M. and Zieman, J.C. B., 2011. Extinction risk assessment of the world's seagrass species. Biological Conservation 144(7): 1961–1971.
 UNEP-WCMC. 2012a. CITES trade statistics derived from the CITES Trade Database. UNEP World Conservation Monitoring Centre, Cambridge, UK.
 UNEP-WCMC. 2012b. Review of Significant Trade: Species selected by the CITES Animals Committee following CoP15.
 UNEP-WCMC. 2016. CITES Trade Database. Cambridge, UK. Available at: http://trade.cites.org/ (accessed 2016)
 Vincent, A.C.J. 1996. The International Trade in Seahorses. TRAFFIC International, Cambridge, UK.
 Vincent, A.C.J. and Sadler, L.M. 1995. Faithful pair bonds in wild seahorses, Hippocampus whitei. Animal Behaviour 50: 1557–1569.
 Vincent, A.C.J., Evans, K.L. and Marsden, A.D. 2005. Home ranges of the monogamous Australian seahorse, Hippocampus whitei. Environmental Biology of Fishes 72: 1–12.
 Vincent, A.C.J., Foster, S.J. and Koldewey, H.J. 2011. Conservation and management of seahorses and other Syngnathidae. Journal of Fish Biology 78: 1681–1724.
 Vincent, A.C.J., Sadovy, Y.J., Fowler, S.L. and Lieberman, S. 2013. The role of CITES in the conservation of marine fishes subject to international trade. Fish and Fisheries 41.
 Williams, S.L., Janetski, N., Abbott, J., Blankenhorn, S., Cheng, B., Crafton, R.E., Hameed, S.O., Rapi, S. and Trockel, D. 2014. Ornamental marine species culture in the Coral Triangle: seahorse demonstration project in the Spermonde Islands, Sulawesi, Indonesia. Environmental Management 54(6): 1342–1355.

External links
 

Hippocampus (genus)
Taxa named by David Starr Jordan
Taxa named by Robert Earl Richardson
Fish described in 1908
Taxonomy articles created by Polbot